, was the third son of King Seong of Baekje who died in battle with Silla forces in 554. Because of the discrepancies in dates it is thought he was actually third son of Wideok of Baekje. Another way to read or write his name is Rimseong.

Japan
Prince Imseong arrived to Japan in 597. The Japanese called him Rinshō Taishi because of the Japanese reading of the characters in his name. The Prince brought metallurgy to Japan, thus changed his last name to Tatara (多々良), which literally means metalworking in Japanese. He then changed his last name to Ōuchi (大内), which was the name of the place he was living.

The first record which says Ōuchi clan has relation with Baekje is that Ōuchi Yoshihiro demanded in 1399 land in Korea because his ancestor came from Baekje, which is written in the Veritable Records of the Joseon Dynasty. The Ōuchis are likely to have started claiming their ancestor had come from Baekje, in order to promote diplomacy with Korea.

Legend
There is also a legend about the God Myōken that is entwined with the prince of Baekje, Prince Imseong:
In ancient times, during the reign of the one-hundred sixth emperor of Japan, Go-Nara-in of Chinzei there was a man named Tandai Ōuchi Tatara Ason Nii Hyōbugyō Yoshitaka. His ancestor was called Prince Rinshō [Imseong], the third son of King Seong of Baekje. Incidentally, on the eighth day of the ninth month of 595 in the reign of Empress Suiko, a big radiant star suddenly fell from the heavens in Aoyanagai no Ura, Washizunoshō Tsuno District, Suō Province and landed on top of a pine tree. It was like the light sent out by a full moon, and it shone for seven days and nights. The various peoples of the region were very surprised and thought it strange. They immediately engaged a shamaness. She spoke, "I am Hokushin Myōken Sonshō, three years from now on the second day of the third month, Prince Imseong of Baekje should come to this country. I have announced this fact to Prince Shōtoku and he has agreed that Prince Imseong should stay. Accordingly, I humbly reported the gist of this to the Empress in Kyoto. Empress Suiko was delighted, and on the second day of the third month of the same fifth year of 597, when over one-hundred imperial court nobles arrived at Tataranohama in Suō Province, the Empress boarded the boat of Prince Imseong and landed at Tataranohama. The prow of the boat was designed as a dragon head and the neck of a fabulous seabird, befitting a noble. She immediately had a palace built in Nagato no Kuni Ōuchi Province and bade him live there. Accordingly, a palace was built promptly for Prince Imseong on Washizuyama. They prayed for the arrival of the deity Hokushin Myōken Sonshō-o, named the place the Star Palace, and fixed the date of worship as the eighteenth day of the ninth month.

Descendants
Prince Imseong became the progenitor of the Ōuchi clan took its name from the place name where they held power. The family possess a document of their descent in the Ōuchi family tree (Ō uchi Tatarashi fuch ō, 大内多々良氏譜牒). On 17 April 2009, the current head of the clan, Ōuchi Kimio (大內公夫), visited Iksan, Korea to pay tribute to his Baekje ancestors.

In November, 657 there is a record stating that Imseong died when he was 81 years old.

Family Tree
Note: Imseong probably came to Japan with his son Imryeong because of his age when he arrived and because his son has a Korean name.
 琳聖太子 (Imseong Taeja; Japanese: Rinshō Taishi, founder of Ōuchi clan)
  　┃
 琳龍太子 (Imryeong Taeja; Japanese: Rinryu Taishi)
  　┃
 阿部太子 (Abe Taishi)
  　┃
 世農太子 (Atoyo Taishi)
  　┃
 世阿太子 (Azusa Taishi)
  　┃
 阿津太子 (Atsu Taishi)
  　┃
 大内正恒 (Ōuchi Masatsune)

See also
Soga clan
Ōuchi clan
Baekje
Monarchs of Korea

References

Baekje people
Baekje Buddhists